The Mangapps Railway Museum (previously Mangapps Farm Railway Museum) is a heritage railway centre located near Burnham-on-Crouch in Essex, England. The  of standard gauge running line and museum are owned and operated by the Jolly family assisted by volunteers.

Museum collection
The museum's collection of rolling stock, in common with most preserved railways stock, may be loaned to other railways from time to time.

Steam locomotives

Diesel locomotives

Diesel Multiple Units

Electrical Multiple Units

External links

 Mangapps Facebook Page

 Mangapps Rly Museum Youtube Channel

Mangapps Railway Museum website.

Museums in Essex
Railway museums in England
Burnham-on-Crouch
Heritage railways in Essex